Electric Daisy Carnival, commonly known as EDC, is an electronic dance music festival organized by promoter and distributor Insomniac. The annual flagship event, EDC Las Vegas, is held in May at the Las Vegas Motor Speedway, and is currently the largest electronic dance music festival in North America.

The event features electronic dance producers and DJs, and incorporates a variety of electronic music, including house, techno, drum and bass, and dubstep. In addition to the music, event goers experience three-dimensional superstructures, colorful glow-in-the-dark environments, and LED lit flora and fauna. There are also interactive art installations throughout EDC, free roaming carnival performers, and carnival rides.

Since its inception, other EDC events have been held in other states and abroad, including Mexico, Puerto Rico, the UK, Brazil, Japan and India. Currently, EDC is held annually in Orlando, China, and Mexico, along with the main Las Vegas event. Sponsors of the most recent EDC events include Corona, Smirnoff, Uber and Tinder.

In 2009, EDC became a two-day event, and in 2011, a three-day event that drew 230,000 people. In 2015, it drew more than 400,000 over three days (134,000 per day). In 2018, EDC Las Vegas expanded the festival to include an on-site camping experience. Recent iterations of the festival have featured eight stages, each with a unique set and specific genre of EDM. 18 carnival rides, four ferris wheels, and a staff of more than 5,000 people make up the event at the Las Vegas Motor Speedway. In 2019 access to purchasing tickets to EDC was expanded to mobile phone apps for convenience. In 2017, EDC won the Festival of the Year award at the Electronic Music Awards.

History

1991–1999 
The first Electric Daisy Carnival was held in 1991, and was first organized by Stephen Hauptfuhr. Philip Blaine—Pasquale's partner—made the deal to grant use of the name Electric Daisy Carnival in 1995 to Pasqualle Rotella CEO of Insomniac Events.

Insomniac debuted their signature event, Electric Daisy Carnival, in 1997 at the Shrine Expo Hall in Los Angeles, California. In the early years, several southern California venues played host to the annual electronic music festival: Los Angeles Memorial Coliseum and Exposition Park in Los Angeles, National Orange Show Events Center in San Bernardino, Queen Mary Events Park in Long Beach, Lake Dolores Waterpark in Barstow, Hansen Dam in Lake View Terrace, and the International Agri-Center in Tulare.

In 1999, Electric Daisy Carnival took place at Lake Dolores Waterpark in Newberry Springs, California. The festival first took place at a small venue at Lake Dolores Waterpark, called Insomniac.

2000–2009 

In 2000, The Electric Daisy Carnival moves to Tulare, California, at the World Ag Expo.

In 2001, Electric Daisy Carnival was held at Hansen Dam in Southern California, expanding for the first time to multiple stages: the Merry Go Round, the Fun House, Clown Alley, the Confusin’ & Amuzin’ Mirror Maze, Bassrush Arena and Cosmic Healing Temple. In the same year, another EDC was held in Austin, Texas.

EDC 2002 was held at Queen Mary Events Park in Long Beach, California. A second edition was planned to be held at the Travis County Exposition Center in Austin, Texas, but the venue cancelled in the days before an event. A make-up show with a different line-up was held a week later for anyone who didn't just get a refund.

From 2003 to 2006, Electric Daisy Carnival was held at the NOS Events Center in San Bernardino, California.

In 2007, Electric Daisy Carnival was held at the Los Angeles Memorial Coliseum in Los Angeles’ Exposition Park.

In 2008, The California event was held June 28 at the Los Angeles Memorial Coliseum and Exposition Park. The EDC Colorado event took place on June 14 at the Arapahoe County Fairgrounds in Aurora.

At the Nocturnal Festival in 2008, EDC revealed its plan to host a two-day festival in California. The event was held on June 26–27. On Friday, approximately 55,000 attendees were present and Saturday saw a crowd of approximately 99,000. EDC 2009 was held at the Los Angeles Memorial Coliseum and used the entire southern half of Exposition Park. The Colorado event was held at the Arapahoe County Fairgrounds in Aurora on June 13. It was headlined by Infected Mushroom, Paul Van Dyk, and several others. EDC Puerto Rico was held on August 14. The venue was The Arena Fairgrounds in San Juan.

2010–2019 

EDC Los Angeles had an attendance of about 185,000 people. Though tickets were starting at $60, some attendees paid over $100 per ticket. It drew criticism from local authorities and promoters after people under the required age of 16 gained entrance, and more than 100 ravers were hospitalized after a crowd stampede. A 15-year-old attendee, Sasha Rodriguez, died after taking MDMA, a psychoactive drug. The city of Los Angeles placed a suspension on all remaining events scheduled for 2010 and for future events, pending the outcome of the new security and safety provisions.  The new provisions included the hiring of on-site doctors, and stated attendees must be over 18 years of age. An EDC Colorado event was held on June 12 at the Arapahoe County Fairground in Aurora. EDC Dallas was held on June 19 at Fair Park in Dallas. 11,000 people were in attendance. EDC Puerto Rico was held on August 28, 2010, at the Estadio Sixto Escobar at Puerta de Tierra, San Juan.

In 2011, due to the previous controversy of EDC's former residence in Los Angeles, EDC moved its flagship festival to Las Vegas, Nevada. The event was held at the Las Vegas Motor Speedway from June 24–26. Reportedly 230,000 people had attended the 3 day festival. EDC Orlando 2011 was held on May 27–28 at Tinker Field, and the grounds adjacent to the Florida Citrus Bowl. EDC Orlando 2011 had approximately 12,000 on Friday and 20,000 on Saturday. EDC Colorado the same year was held at the Arapahoe County Fairgrounds in Aurora on June 11. Electric Daisy Carnival Dallas was held June 18 at Fair Park with an estimated 25,000 attendees. Temperatures above 110 degrees led to dozens of hospitalizations and at least one death, which made it the last EDC held in Dallas. EDC Puerto Rico took place on August 27.

In 2012, the three-day EDC in Vegas (June 8–10) saw attendance increase by 30%, to a total of 320,000 attendees. A 31-year-old male from Florida died after being struck by a truck as he left EDC at the Las Vegas Motor Speedway on June 11. Friends reported that he had been drinking and smoking. The second night had to shut down early at 1 a.m. due to high winds, of up to 30 MPH that started around 8 p.m. 90,000 fans were directed to the speedway's bleachers. DJs Markus Schulz and Steve Aoki, who were both scheduled to play that night, performed impromptu sets on the Insomniac Wide Awake art car, a much smaller, mobile stage, for a short period, before officials ordered it to close as potentially dangerous winds were expected until 5 a.m. In order to make up for the cancellation, Insomniac allowed those with Saturday passes to return on Sunday. EDC Orlando was held at Tinker Field on November 9–10. This coincided with the annual Dayglow event in Fort Lauderdale, Florida, called "Dancegiving" held the weekend after Thanksgiving. EDC New York was held May 18–20 at the MetLife Stadium at the Meadowlands Sports Complex in East Rutherford, New Jersey. Although the venue was located in New Jersey, the festival was coined Electric Daisy Carnival New York due to the proximity to New York City. The event drew 45,000 attendees per day.

In 2013, EDC Las Vegas was held June 21–23. EDC was held in London for the first time, along with events in Chicago, New York, San Juan, Puerto Rico, and Orlando, Florida.

In 2014, EDC was held at the Las Vegas Motor Speedway on June 20–22, 2014. Insomniac Events announced that all 345,000 tickets to the three-day festival had been sold by June 18, 2014. At the conclusion of the 2014 event, the massive three-day festival drew in roughly 134,000 per day. The setup at the event also led Insomniac to set the record for the largest structural stage in North America. EDC events were also held in Milton Keynes, England, San Juan, Orlando, Florida, and New York. The first EDC Mexico was held on March 15–16, 2014. A documentary film called Under the Electric Sky about the festival premiered at the 2014 Sundance Film Festival.

EDC Las Vegas 2015 was held in Las Vegas, Nevada, at the Las Vegas Motor Speedway on June 19, 20 & 21. Its stage featured a blinking owl as background theme.  EDC Las Vegas 2015 was met with unwanted publicity for the death of a UC Irvine graduate on the second night of the festival. Death was ruled as related to MDMA, which has side effects of dehydration and increase in body temperature. EDC was also held at Orlando, Florida at Tinker Field on November 6 & 7, and East Rutherford, New Jersey at MetLife Stadium on May 23 & 24. Internationally, EDC was held at Estadio Sixto Escobar in San Juan, Puerto Rico for the sixth time on February 21 & 22, Autódromo José Carlos Pace in São Paulo, Brazil for the first time December 4 & 5, Autódromo Hermanos Rodríguez in Mexico City, Mexico for the second time on February 28 – March 1, and the National Bowl in Milton Keynes, UK for the third time on July 17.

In 2016, EDC Las Vegas was held at Las Vegas Motor Speedway from June 17–19. The event saw DJ Marshmello removing his helmet in a gimmick to be the DJ Tiësto. EDC Mexico was held for the third time at Autódromo Hermanos Rodríguez in Mexico City, from February 27–28, 2016. EDC New York was held at Citi Field in Queens, NY, from May 14–15, 2016. EDC UK was held at Milton Keynes, England on 9 July 2016. EDC Orlando was held at Tinker Field in Orlando, Florida, from November 4–5, 2016. EDC India was held at Buddh International Circuit in New Delhi, India, from November 12–13, 2016.

In 2017, EDC returned to the Las Vegas Motor Speedway from June, with over 135,000 attendees on opening night. Heat-related health incidents saw a significant increase, with double the medical-related calls on opening night year-over-year. A 34-year-old man died after taking MDMA and TFMPP, a drug similar to MDMA, with heat exposure as a contributing factor. EDC was held for the fourth time in Mexico City at Autódromo Hermanos Rodríguez from 25 to 26 February. EDC UK 2017, due to be held at Milton Keynes, England in July 2017, was cancelled. EDC Orlando 2017 was held at Tinker Field on November 10–11, 2017.

In 2018, EDC Orlando was held at Tinker Field from November 9–10. EDC Las Vegas was held at the Las Vegas Motor Speedway from May 18–20; the festival was moved from its traditional June scheduling so that it will be held in relatively cooler conditions. The festival also introduced on-site camping (including rentable campers and RV parking) and earlier opening times in order to reduce traffic congestion. An estimated 411,400 people attended the festival over the three days. EDC Mexico in Mexico City was planned for February 24–25 at Autodromo Hermanos Rodriguez. EDC Japan was held in Tokyo, May 12 & 13 at Chiba Seaside Park Zozo Marine Stadium. Heavy Rains caused equipment issues. EDC China in Shanghai, April 29 & 30, debut at Shanghai International Music Park.

In 2019, EDC Las Vegas returned to the Las Vegas Motor Speedway for May 17–19. On the second day, high winds forced stage closures. Due to wording of the message displayed on screens, and the played audio message instructing them to "take cover in your car", some attendees were led to believe that the entire festival was being shut down for the night and subsequently  left the speedway. Upon learning at the exit that only certain areas were closed for safety precautions some people tried to re-enter the grounds but were not allowed back in due to the event's strict no-reentry policy. Las Vegas police announced 65 arrests during the festival, including 2 DUIs and 51 felony or gross misdemeanor arrests. EDC Mexico in Mexico City returned to Autodromo Hermanos Rodriguez for February 23–24, 2019. EDC Orlando is now held for 3 days, instead of the normal 2 days. It will remain at Tinker Field, outside of Camping World Stadium. EDC Japan was held in Tokyo, May 11 & 12, 2019 at ZOZO Marine Stadium & Makuhari Beach Park. EDC Korea was held on 31 August & 1 September at Seoul Land, Gwacheon, South Korea.

2020–present 
In 2020, EDC Mexico in Mexico City was held at Autódromo Hermanos Rodríguez for February 28–March 2. It was announced that the 2020 festival would utilize more of the Las Vegas Motor Speedway grounds, with Rotella pointing out that the speedway had removed a large number of RV hookups that had made certain areas of the grounds unusable. The festival was originally scheduled to take place from May 15–17, but was rescheduled for October 2–4. However, in July 2020, the festival was cancelled due to the COVID-19 pandemic. A virtual festival, streamed live on Twitch and YouTube,  took place during the original scheduled dates.

In 2021, EDC Las Vegas was originally scheduled to be held from May 21–23. However. Clark County on April 20 passed a reopening plan that requires 60% of their residents to be vaccinated before restrictions over large scale gatherings such as EDC can be lifted. In a statement released on social media, Insomniac Events CEO Pasquale Rotella stated, "Unfortunately, the rate at which people get vaccinated before EDC is out of our control. It might happen in time, it might not. Either way, we can’t take that risk." The event instead took place from October 22–24. The Electronic Dance Music (EDM) festival had the most number of attendees in Las Vegas, with an average of around 104,000 people attending each night. During this time span, the medical district provided care to 2,673 different patients. The patients' ages ranged from 18 to 42 years old, with a median age of 22. Intoxication from alcohol or drugs, dehydration and dizziness, or trauma were the primary causes of patients seeking medical attention at the urgent care center.

Charity 
For every flagship festival held, Insomniac Care donates a percentage of ticket sales to national charities and community organizations. In the past, EDC Las Vegas has partnered with Surreal, a fundraising platform, to raise money from festival goers who enter in a sweepstake for helicopter rides and other activities with popular DJs. Since 2011, over two million dollars have been donated to groups. Some organizations are named below.
 Rock the Vote
 Families for Effective Autism Treatment
 Injured Police Officers Fund
 Boys and Girls Club of Southern Nevada
 Nevada Childhood Cancer Foundation
 The Las Vegas Academy for Arts

Media 
A documentary film, Under the Electric Sky, premiered at the 2014 Sundance Film Festival. The film chronicles the community and life of festival-goers during EDC Las Vegas 2013.

Awards and nominations

International Dance Music Awards

2010-2016

2018–present

Notes

References

External links 

 
 Insomniac website

Rave
Music festivals established in 1997
Music festivals in Nevada
Las Vegas Motor Speedway
Music festivals in Orlando, Florida
Electronic music festivals in the United States
Electronic music festivals in the United Kingdom
Electronic music festivals in India
Electronic music festivals in Japan
Electronic music festivals in Mexico
Dance in California
Music festivals in California